The Lackawanna Valley is a c. 1855 painting by the American artist George Inness. Painted in oil on canvas, it is one of Inness' most well-known works. It is in the collection of the National Gallery of Art in Washington, D.C. 

The painting was commissioned from Inness by John Jay Phelps the first president of the Delaware, Lackawanna and Western Railroad, and depicts the Lackawanna Valley in Pennsylvania at the site of the railroad's first roundhouse in Scranton.

Notes

References
 Bell, Adrienne Baxter. George Inness and the Visionary Landscape. National Academy of Design, New York, 2003. 
 Cikovsky, Jr., Nicolai; Quick, Michael. George Inness. Los Angeles County Museum of Art, 1985. 
Stavriannos, Ioannis K. Images and words: change and chaos in American culture
 National Gallery of Art

1855 paintings
Landscape paintings
American paintings
Collections of the National Gallery of Art
Delaware, Lackawanna and Western Railroad